These are the official results of the Women's 10 km Walk at the 1996 Summer Olympics in Atlanta, Georgia. There were a total of 44 competitors, with one athlete who did not finish the race and five disqualifications.

Medalists

Abbreviations
All times shown are in hours:minutes:seconds

Final ranking

See also
1996 Race Walking Year Ranking

References

External links
 Official Report
 Results

W
Racewalking at the Olympics
1996 in women's athletics
Women's events at the 1996 Summer Olympics